Chābahār  (formerly Bandar Beheshtī) is the capital city of Chabahar County, Sistan and Baluchestan Province, Iran. It is a free port (free-trade zone) situated on the coast of the Gulf of Oman, and is Iran's southernmost city.

The city is situated on the Makran Coast of the Iranian province of Sistan and Baluchestan, and is officially designated as a "Free Trade and Industrial Zone" by the Iranian government. Due to its free-trade zone status, the city has increased in significance in international trade. The overwhelming majority of the city's inhabitants are ethnic Baloch people, who speak their native Balochi language in addition to Persian.

Etymology

The name Chabahar is a shortened form of the Balochi phrase chahar bahar (Persian: چهاربهار), where chahar means "four" and bahar means "spring". Hence, Chabahar means a place where all four seasons of the year resemble spring time.

History
There is a fishing village and former port named Tis in Chabahar's neighborhood, which dates from 2500 BC, known in Alexander the Great's conquests as Tiz, eventually renamed Tis. In addition, in his book Aqd al-Ala lel-Moghefe al Ahla, Afdhal al-Din abu Hamid Kermani wrote in 584 A.H. (1188 C.E.) about the port of Tiz and its commerce and trade. According to the scholar and historian,  Alberuni, author of an encyclopedic work on India called "Tarikh Al-Hind",  the sea coast of India commences with Tiz or modern Chabahar. Tis was formerly an active commercial port, and was destroyed by the Mongols. There are still some ruins in the village. The Portuguese were the first colonial country to attack the Makran (Oman) Sea. The Portuguese forces under Afonso de Albuquerque gained control of Chabahar and Tis, staying there until 1031 A.H. (1621 C.E.). The British, and later the Portuguese in the 17th century (1616 C.E. or 1026 A.H.), entered this region.

Modern Chabahar dates back to around 1970 C.E., when it was declared a municipality and large port projects were started by order of Mohammad Reza Pahlavi. A modern naval and air base was established as part of the Shah's policy of making Iran into a dominant power in the Indian Ocean. At that time these and other development projects in and around Chabahar involved the extensive participation of foreign companies, especially from the United States. After the 1979 C.E. revolution the foreign companies left the projects and Iranian public companies linked to the Ministry of Jahad-e Sazandegi (or jihad for construction) took them over. The Iran–Iraq War caused Chabahar to gain in logistical and strategic importance. War brought insecurity to the Strait of Hormuz and ships were unable to enter the Persian Gulf. Accordingly, Chabahar became a major port during the war. In the 1980s the Iranian government developed a new scheme named the Eastern Axis Development Scheme, which aimed to use Chabahar's geographical position as a regional development tool to stimulate economic growth in the eastern provinces. The establishment of the Chabahar Free Trade-Industrial Zone in 1992 resulting from the EAD Scheme brought development and encouraged immigration from other parts of the country to Chabahar.

Economic significance

Chabahar is Iran's closest and best access point to the Indian Ocean. For this reason, Chabahar is the focal point of Iranian development of the east of the country through expansion and enhancement of transit routes among countries situated in the northern part of the Indian Ocean and Central Asia. The hope is that with the development of transit routes, and better security and transit services, the benefits will reach the local residents.

Chabahar's economic sectors are fish industries and commercial sector, fishery sectors with the largest amount of country's fish catch, mainly located out of the Chabahar Free Trade-Industrial Zone. Growing commercial sector located at free trade area with high potentiality to turn to a place that would connect business growth centers in south Asia (India) and Middle East (Dubai) to central Asian and Afghanistan market. The government plans to link the Chabahar free trade area to Iran's main rail network, which is connected to Central Asia and Afghanistan as well.

The city is served by Refah Chain Stores Co., Iran Hyper Star, Isfahan City Center, Shahrvand Chain Stores Inc., Ofoq Kourosh chain store.

Transportation
Chabahar is connected to multimodal transportation through air, sea and roads. Its Konarak Airport has twice daily flights to the capital Tehran, thrice weekly flights to Zahedan and twice weekly flights to Mashhad, Shiraz and Bandar Abbas. It has also a weekly international flight to Doha and Dubai and a biweekly flight to Mascat. Chabahar has two jetties that connect it to international waterways. Iranian contractors are developing both jetties to provide port facilities for handling of 6 million tons of goods a year; this is expected to be completed by 2011. Chabahar is connected to national road networks. Chabahar–Bandar Abbas, Chabahar–Iranshahr–Kerman, Chabahar–Iranshahr–Zahedan–Mashahd and Chabahar–Iranshahr–Zahedan–Milak (on the Afghanistan border) are four main routes connecting Chabahar to national and international roads.

In July 2016, India began shipping US$150 million worth of rail tracks to Chabahar to build US$1.6 billion Chabahar–Zahedan railway by India's Ircon International, for which India pledged additional US$400 million and Iran has also allocated US$125 million in December 2016, thus taking the total allocation to US$575 million (out of US$1.6 billion needed) till the end of 2016.

Port 

India is helping develop the Chabahar Port, which will give it access to the oil and gas resources in Iran and the Central Asian states. By doing so, India hopes to compete with the Chinese, who are building Gwadar Port on the other side of the border in Pakistan's Balochistan Province. In 2014, Indian government sanctioned an initial amount US$85 million for the development of Chabahar port. By 2016, as sanctions against Iran were being lifted after the nuclear deal, Indian investment plans had risen to US$500 million.
In turn, Iran will get its first deepwater port, to allow it to conduct global trade with big cargo ships rather than the small ships its ports can currently handle, thus putting an end to its reliance on the United Arab Emirates as a shipping intermediary. On top of that, Chabahar shall be used for transshipment to Afghanistan and Central Asia, while keeping the port of Bandar Abbas as a major hub mainly for trade with Russia and Europe.

India, Iran and Afghanistan have signed an agreement to give Indian goods, heading for Central Asia and Afghanistan, preferential treatment and tariff reductions at Chabahar.

Work on the Chabahar–Milak–Zaranj–Dilaram route from Iran to Afghanistan is in progress. Iran is, with Indian aid, upgrading the Chabahar–Milak road and constructing a bridge on the route to Zaranj. India's BRO is laying the 213-kilometer Zaranj–Dilaram road, which is now operational. It is a part of India's US$750 million aid package to Afghanistan.

Interest in Chabahar port's project renewed once US-sponsored economic isolation of Iran was relieved, and benefits from the resurgent Indian economy. Along with Bandar Abbas, Chabahar is the Iranian entrepot on the north–south corridor. A strategic partnership between India, Iran and Russia is intended to establish a multi-modal transport link connecting Mumbai with St. Petersburg, providing Europe and the former Soviet republics of Central Asia access to Asia and vice versa.

India and Iran are discussing building a gas pipeline between the two countries along the bed of the Arabian Sea to bypass Pakistan, using the Chabahar port. Both the countries are pondering the delivery of natural gas produced in Turkmenistan with Indian assistance to north Iran while the Islamic Republic will send natural gas from its southern deposits to Indian consumers. This pipeline is conceived by India to replace the proposed Iran–Pakistan gas pipeline, the negotiations for which have dragged on due to the worsening of relations between India and Pakistan.

Railway line from Bamiyan province in Afghanistan
India has finalized a plan to build a 900 km–long railway line from Bamiyan Province in Afghanistan to Chabahar port. An Indian steel consortium led by Steel Authority of India Limited has landed an exploration contract in the Hajigak coal fields located in the Bamiyan Province 130 km west of Kabul. This region is believed to have iron ore reserves of around 1.8 billion tonnes containing around 62% ferrous iron worth $3 trillion according to Afghan-Soviet studies of the region in the 1960s.

Religion
A majority of Chabahar's people are Sunni Baluch.

Tourism

A $500 million resort is planned to be built in Chabahar.

Climate
The county of Chabahar has hot, humid weather in the summer and warm weather in the winter, giving it a hot desert climate (Köppen climate classification BWh). The western winds in the winter bring about scattered rainfalls in this region, and very occasionally winds from the Indian monsoon affect the region, as in July 1976 when  fell. The summer monsoon winds from the Indian subcontinent make Chabahar the coolest southern port in the summer and the warmest port of Iran in the winter. It has an average maximum temperature of 34 °C and an average minimum temperature of 21.5 °C. It has the same latitude as Miami in Florida, United States, and temperatures are very similar to those in Miami.

See also

 Free Trade Zones in Iran
 International University of Chabahar
 Makran

References

External links
 http://www.iranchamber.com/people/articles/cultural_anthropology_of_baluchis.php
 https://web.archive.org/web/20141215001158/http://www.freezones.ir/Default.aspx?tabid=263

Cities in Sistan and Baluchestan Province
Economy of Iran
Gulf of Oman
Populated places in Chabahar County
Port cities and towns in Iran